Use Your Nose  is the first EP by Swedish punk rock band Millencolin, released on 4 December 1993 by Burning Heart Records. All of the songs from the EP were re-released on the 1999 compilation album The Melancholy Collection.  The phrase "use your nose" refers to a skateboarding trick in which the rider slides with the nose, or front part, of the skateboard.  A skateboarder using his nose to slide on a rail is illustrated on the cover of the album. The track "Use Your Nose" is a hidden track following "Nosepicker".

Track listing
"In a Room" – 3:00
"Pain" – 2:24
"Shake Me" – 2:20
"Melack" – 2:16
"Nosepicker" – 3:38
"Use Your Nose" (hidden track) – 1:36

Personnel

Millencolin
Nikola Sarcevic - lead vocals, bass
Erik Ohlsson - guitar
Mathias Färm - guitar
Fredrik Larzon - drums

Millencolin albums
1993 debut EPs
Burning Heart Records EPs